Peter Kiel (born 2 October 1958) is a former Australian rules footballer who played in the Victorian Football League (VFL). He played for St Kilda as a utility. Kiel won the club's best and fairest award in his first year, but never quite recaptured the same form. Later in his career he was given tagging roles.

References

External links

Demon Wiki profile

St Kilda Football Club players
Melbourne Football Club players
Living people
Trevor Barker Award winners
Australian rules footballers from Victoria (Australia)
1958 births
Golden Point Football Club players